Tiefer Trebbower See is a lake in Mecklenburgische Seenplatte, Mecklenburgische Seenplatte, Mecklenburg-Vorpommern, Germany. At an elevation of 57.8 m, its surface area is 0.41 km².

External links 
 

Lakes of Mecklenburg-Western Pomerania